The Fifty-third Oklahoma Legislature was the meeting of the legislative branch of the government of Oklahoma, composed of the Senate and the House of Representatives. State legislators met at the Oklahoma State Capitol in Oklahoma City from January 4, 2011, to January 8, 2013, during the first two years of the first administration of Governor Mary Fallin.

Dates of sessions
Organizational day: January 4, 2011
First regular session: February 7, 2011 – May 27, 2011
Second regular session: February 6, 2012 – May 25, 2012
Previous: 52nd Legislature • Next: 54th Legislature

Party composition

Senate

House of Representatives

Major legislation

Enacted
2011 Legislative Session
Abortion - HB 1888 banned abortions after 20 weeks of pregnancy, except in situations dangerous or life-threatening to the mother.
Abortion - SB 547 mandated that standard health insurance policies sold in Oklahoma or sold through a state health insurance exchange do not include elective abortion coverage.
Agency consolidation - HB 2140 consolidated the Oklahoma Department of Central Services, Oklahoma Office of Personnel Management, Oklahoma State Employees Benefits Council, and the State and Education Employees Group Insurance Board into the Oklahoma Office of State Finance.
Corrections reform - HB 2131 expanded eligibility of low-risk, nonviolent inmates for community sentencing and electronic monitoring programs.
Education reform - SB 346 eliminated social promotion from public schools after the third grade.
Education reform - HB 1456 established an "A-F" Grade System for public schools.
Education reform - HB 1380 eliminated the ability of public school teachers to appeal any termination to state district courts as a trial de novo.
Education reform - HB 2139 increased the authority of the Oklahoma Superintendent of Public Instruction to manage the Oklahoma State Department of Education.
Guns - HB 1439 expanded the right of Oklahomans to use deadly force at their place of business if they feel threatened.
Guns - HB 1652 - allowed licensed Oklahomans to carry a concealed weapon on Oklahoma Department of Career and Technology Education facilities.
Pensions - HB 2132 required any cost of living adjustment increases to be fully funded prior to implementation.
Pensions - HB 1010 increased the retirement age for new members of the Oklahoma Uniform Retirement System for Justices and Judges from 65 to 67.
Pensions - SB 377 increased the retirement age for new members of the Oklahoma Teachers' Retirement System from 62 to 65 and establishes a minimum age of 60 for full retirement benefits for teachers who meet the rule of 90 (age plus years of service).
Pensions - SB 794 ensured that elected officials are treated the same as other public employees when calculating retirement benefits.
Pensions - SB 347 provided for the forfeiture of a municipal employee's retirement benefits upon conviction of crimes related to their office.
Public employee unions - HB 1593 repealed requirement that cities grant collective bargaining rights to their non-police and non-fire employees.
Tort reform - HB 2128 reduced the cap on non-economic damages in tort lawsuits from $400,000 to $350,000.
Tort reform - SB 862 eliminated joint and several liability from tort lawsuits.

2012 Legislative Session
Education agency consolidation - SB 1797 consolidated the Oklahoma Teacher Preparation Commission, which oversees teacher training requirements, and the Oklahoma Office of Accountability, which monitors the performance of public schools, into new Oklahoma Office of Educational Quality and Accountability under the direction of the Oklahoma Secretary of Education.
Guns - SB 1733 authorized citizens to openly carry firearms upon receiving a license from the Oklahoma State Bureau of Investigation.
Public safety - HB 3052 establishes the Justice Reinvestment Initiative to provide grants to local criminal justice agencies, mandated mental health screenings prior to sentencing, increased parole and community corrections for non-violent offenders, and included other provisions to reduce incarceration rates.
Energy efficiency - SB 1096 directs all State agencies to reduce energy consumption by 20 percent by 2020
Energy research - SB 1627 established the Oklahoma Energy Initiative to fund energy research and development projects
Litigation reform - HB 2654 limits the remedies available to royalty owners for disputes with oil and gas companies
Transportation - HB 2248 increases annual funding to the Oklahoma Department of Transportation to address failing bridges and highways
Transportation - HB 2249 increases annual funding to the various counties to address failing bridges and highways
Physicians -  HB 3058 expands Oklahoma Hospital Residency Training Program to address physician shortage in rural areas
Welfare reform - HB 2388 requires the Oklahoma Department of Human Services the drug-test all adult who apply for the Temporary Assistance for Needy Families program
Abortion - SB 1274 requires doctors to inform pregnant women that she has the right to hear the heartbeat of fetus prior to performing an abortion
Veterans - SB 1863 allows military veterans to transfer military experience for academic credits and other professional licensing requirements
Meth production - HB 2941 limits the amount of pseudoephedrine which may be purchased within a given time span
Veterans - HB 2689 allows children of military personnel from Oklahoma to receive in-state college tuition without regard for state of residency
Water - HB 3055 commits the state to using no more fresh water in 2060 than is presently used

Failed
2012 Legislative Session
HB 3061 - Income tax cut - Lowers the rate of the state income tax
SB 1990 - American Indian Cultural Center - authorizes a bond issue to pay for the completion of an Oklahoma City-based museum

Added to 2012 ballot as a referendum
HJR 1092 - Human Services Commission - Gave voters the opportunity to abolish constitutionally-authorized commission overseeing Department of Human Services, gives oversight to state legislators

Leadership

Senate
 President of the Senate: Todd Lamb (R-Oklahoma City)
 President pro tempore: Brian Bingman (R-Sapulpa)

Republican caucus
Majority Floor Leader: Mike Schultz
Assistant Majority Floor Leader: Clark Jolley
Assistant Majority Floor Leader: Anthony Sykes
Assistant Majority Floor Leader: John Ford
Majority Whip: Cliff Branan
Majority Whip: Dan Newberry
Majority Whip: Gary Stanislawski
Majority Whip: Rob Johnson
Majority Caucus Chairman: Bryce Marlatt
Majority Caucus Vice-Chairman: David Holt

House of Representatives
 Speaker: Kris Steele (R-Shawnee)
 Speaker pro tempore: Jeffrey W. Hickman  (R-Fairview)

Republican caucus
Republican Majority Leader: Dale DeWitt
Republican Majority Floor Leader: Dan Sullivan
Assistant Republican Majority Floor Leader: Lisa Billy
Assistant Republican Majority Floor Leader: Gary Banz
Assistant Republican Majority Floor Leader: Mike Jackson
Assistant Republican Majority Floor Leader: George Faught
Assistant Republican Majority Floor Leader: Dennis Johnson
Assistant Republican Majority Floor Leader: Leslie Osborn
Republican Majority Whip: Skye McNiel
Deputy Republican Majority Whip: Dennis Casey
Deputy Republican Majority Whip: Marian Cooksey
Deputy Republican Majority Whip: Corey Holland
Deputy Republican Majority Whip: Fred Jordan
Deputy Republican Majority Whip: Steve Martin
Deputy Republican Majority Whip: Randy McDaniel
Deputy Republican Majority Whip: Mike Sanders
Deputy Republican Majority Whip: Paul Wesselhoft
Republican Majority Caucus Chairman: Weldon Watson
Republican Majority Caucus Vice Chairman: Harold Wright
Republican Majority Caucus Secretary: Marian Cooksey

Democratic caucus
 Democratic Minority Leader: Scott Inman
 Democratic Minority Floor Leader: Mike Brown
 Deputy Democratic Floor Leader: Eric Proctor
 Assistant Democratic Floor Leader: Wes Hilliard
 Assistant Democratic Floor Leader: Steve Kouplen
 Assistant Democratic Floor Leader: Al McAffrey
 Assistant Democratic Floor Leader: Jeannie McDaniel
 Assistant Democratic Floor Leader: Wade Rousselot
 Assistant Democratic Floor Leader: Mike Shelton
 Democratic Whip: Ben Sherrer
 Assistant Democratic Whip: Cory T. Williams
 Democratic Caucus Chairman: Jerry McPeak
 Minority Caucus Vice Chairman: Joe Dorman
 Democratic Caucus Secretary: Donnie Condit

Membership

Senate

House of Representatives

References and notes

External links
 Oklahoma Legislature Homepage
 State of Oklahoma's Website
 Legislative Bill Tracking Website

Oklahoma legislative sessions
2011 in Oklahoma
2012 in Oklahoma
2011 U.S. legislative sessions
2012 U.S. legislative sessions